The journal Consciousness and Cognition provides a forum for scientific approaches to the issues of consciousness, voluntary control, and self. The journal was launched by Bernard Baars and William Banks.

The journal's editor-in-chief positions were held by Bernard Baars, late William Banks and late Bruce Bridgeman. Currently the editorial team includes Gregory Francis, Stephanie Goodhew, J. Timothy Lane, Michael A. Pitts, Antti Revonsuo, Devin Terhune, and Talis Bachmann (editor-in-chief).

Notes

External links
 

Consciousness studies
Elsevier academic journals
10 times per year journals